Mount Pleasant is an underground light rail transit (LRT) station under construction on Line 5 Eglinton, a new line that is part of the Toronto subway system. The station will be located in North Toronto at the intersection of Mount Pleasant Road and Eglinton Avenue. Nearby destinations include Northern Secondary School and the Davisville Village neighbourhood. It is scheduled to open in 2023.

Description

The station will have two entrances. The main, accessible entrance will be at the northwest corner of Eglinton Avenue and Mt. Pleasant Road. The secondary entrance will be just east of Mount Pleasant Road on the north side. The station will have storage for 30 bicycles.

The main entrance of the station at 256–258 Eglinton Avenue East was the location of a former branch of the Imperial Bank of Canada, in a building designed by architect Herbert Horner in 1928. Metrolinx had the building's façade disassembled brick-by-brick, cataloged, labelled and stored for reassembly upon completion of station structure. Only the building's façade will be preserved.

Surface connections 

, the following are the proposed connecting routes that would serve this station when Line 5 Eglinton opens:

References

External links
Mount Pleasant station project page at the Eglinton Crosstown website

Line 5 Eglinton stations